Luke Clausen of the Spokane Valley is a professional fisherman. Clausen won the 36th Bassmaster Classic held on Lake Tohopekaliga in central Florida, from February 23–26, 2006.

References

American fishers
Living people
People from Spokane Valley, Washington
Year of birth missing (living people)
21st-century American people